Caloplaca saviczii is a species of crustose lichen in the family Teloschistaceae. Found in the Russian Far East, it was formally described as a new species in 2021 by Ivan Frolov, Dmitry Himelbrant, Irina Stepanchikova, Liudmila Konoreva, and Sergey Chesnokov. The type specimen was collected in the fluvial valley of River Katal'yanayvayam (Penzhinsky District, Kamchatka); here, in a floodplain forest, it was found growing on the bark of Populus suaveolens. The specific epithet saviczii honours Russian lichenologist Vsevolod Pavlovich Savich (1885–1972), who studied the lichens of Kamchatka.

See also
List of Caloplaca species

References

saviczii
Lichen species
Lichens described in 2021
Lichens of the Russian Far East